Kucharski (feminine: Kucharska; plural: Kucharscy) is a Polish surname. It may refer to:
 Cezary Kucharski (born 1972) Polish footballer
 Dawid Kucharski (born 1984), Polish footballer
 Kazimierz Kucharski (1909–1995), Polish athlete
 Leszek Kucharski (born 1959), Polish table tennis player
 Tomasz Kucharski (born 1974), Polish rower

Polish-language surnames
Occupational surnames